John Harkness may refer to:

 John C. Harkness (1916–2016), American architect
 John Harkness (cricketer) (1867-1960), New Zealand cricketer
 Jack Harkness (footballer, born 1907) (John Diamond Harkness, 1907–1985), Scottish footballer
 John Granville Harkness (1831–1900), British Major-General during the Victorian era
Steve Englehart, comic book writer who used pseudonym John Harkness
John Harkness, a character in You're in the Navy Now

See also
Jack Harkness (disambiguation)